David Huebert is a Canadian writer from Halifax, Nova Scotia.

Huebert, at the time a Ph.D. student in English literature at the University of Western Ontario, was a winner of the CBC Literary Prize in the short stories category in 2016 for the story "Enigma".

His debut short story collection, Peninsula Sinking, was published in 2017, and was a finalist for the Danuta Gleed Literary Award in 2018. In 2021, it was also retroactively shortlisted for the delayed 2018 ReLit Award for short fiction.

In 2020 he was shortlisted for the Journey Prize for his short story "Chemical Valley". It was the title story of his second short story collection, Chemical Valley (2021), which was shortlisted for the 2022 ReLit Award for short fiction and both the Thomas Head Raddall Award for fiction and the Alistair MacLeod Prize for Short Fiction at the 2022 Atlantic Book Awards.

He has also published the poetry chapbook Full Mondegreens (2017), a collaboration with Andy Verboom in which they composed mondegreen versions of other writers' previously published poetry, and the solo poetry collection Humanimus (2020).

He is currently an assistant professor of English literature at the University of New Brunswick.

References

External links

21st-century Canadian male writers
21st-century Canadian short story writers
21st-century Canadian poets
Canadian male short story writers
Canadian male poets
Writers from Halifax, Nova Scotia
University of Western Ontario alumni
Academic staff of the University of New Brunswick
Living people
Year of birth missing (living people)